Vanwall was a motor racing team and racing car constructor that was active in Formula One during the 1950s. Founded by Tony Vandervell, the Vanwall name was derived by combining the name of the team owner with that of his Thinwall bearings produced at the Vandervell Products factory at Acton, London. Originally entering modified Ferraris in non-championship races, Vanwall constructed their first cars to race in the 1954 Formula One season. The team achieved their first race win in the 1957 British Grand Prix, with Stirling Moss and Tony Brooks sharing a VW 5, earning the team the distinction of constructing the first British-built car to win a World Championship race. Vandervell's failing health meant 1958 would be the last full season; the squad ran cars in a handful of races in the following years, but finished racing in 1961.

History 
Tony Vandervell's Vanwall Company made Babbit bearings  under licence from the Cleveland Graphite Bronze Company; W. A. Robotham of Rolls-Royce said that "it was an exceedingly difficult task ... knowing the American company well". 

Tony Vandervell was one of the original backers of British Racing Motors. In the early 1950s he entered a series of modified Ferraris in Formule Libre races under the name "Thinwall Special".

The first actual Vanwalls were known as Vanwall Specials and were built for the new Formula 1 regulations in 1954 at Cox Green, Maidenhead. The chassis was designed by Owen Maddock and built by the Cooper Car Company.
The 2.0 L engine was designed by Norton engineer Leo Kuzmicki, and was essentially four Manx single-cylinder  engines with a common waterjacket, cylinder head (a copy of the Norton's) and valvetrain, with induction by four AMAL motorcycle carburetors. This combination was fitted to a Rolls-Royce B40 military engine crankcase, copied in aluminium. Designed for Formula Two, which was supplanted before it appeared, the car debuted in a Grande Epreuve in the 1954 British Grand Prix. Against 2½ litre Formula One competition, it was at a decided disadvantage. The Goodyear disc brakes (built by Vanwall) proved successful, but the front suspension and fuel and cooling systems were troublesome. Development continued with a switch to Bosch fuel injection (thanks to Vandervell's "persuading" Daimler-Benz, a major Bosch customer, to allow it), while retaining the AMAL throttle bodies; they were plagued with throttle linkage trouble, due to vibration from the big four-cylinder. Vanwalls then ran for a season in F1 without much in the way of success. At the end of the 1955 season, it was plain that the engine was sound, but that  the Ferrari-derived chassis needed improvement. It was suggested to Vandervell that he should hire the services of a young up-and-coming designer to improve their cars. The designer was Colin Chapman.

The new 1956 cars designed by Chapman (along with the aerodynamicist Frank Costin) were of space frame construction, the De Dion rear axle's unsprung weight reduced and front torsion bar added. (None of these ideas were revolutionary, but Chapman was happy simply to be meticulous.) Furthermore, a fifth gear and Porsche synchromesh were added to the transmission. The solution which today is obvious, mounting the engine behind the driver, would take two more years to be accepted. Costin made the most of it, and produced a car "much faster in a straight line than any of its rivals".

The new car showed early promise in 1956 by winning the non-championship F1 race at Silverstone against strong opposition. It set the lap record at Syracuse Stirling Moss drove the car to victory in what was his only drive for Vanwall that year, as he was still contracted to drive for Maserati in F1.  Talented drivers Harry Schell and Maurice Trintignant were the full-timers for the season.  However, neither of them had much success although the car showed obvious potential.

With the car developing and becoming ever more competitive, Moss eventually decided to drive for the team in 1957.  He was joined by two Englishmen, Tony Brooks and Stuart Lewis-Evans.  As the 1957 season unfolded, the cars became faster and more reliable. Moss and Brooks duly shared Vanwall's first Grand Prix victory in Britain at Aintree, and Moss went on to win both the Italian (where only being piloted by Fangio enabled the Maserati to run with the Vanwalls, for Moss finished with 41 seconds in hand even after a pit stop) and Pescara Grands Prix.

At the end of 1957, alcohol fuels were banned and replaced by a compulsory 130-octane aviation gasoline. This caused problems for Vanwall and BRM with their large bore engines that required methanol for engine cooling. During the race, where revs were reduced, only 255–262 bhp at 7,200–7,400 rpm was available. This put them at a disadvantage to the new Dino Ferrari V6 cars with a claimed 290 PS (286 bhp) at 8,300 rpm. The Vanwall's superior road holding (thanks to suspension changes, new steel wheels, and new nylon-cord Dunlop R5 racing tyres), streamlining, 5-speed gearbox, and disc brakes helped to offset this.

All three drivers stayed with the team in 1958, and Moss (wins in the Netherlands, Portugal and Morocco) and Brooks (wins in Belgium, Germany and Italy) each won three championship races that season.  Vanwall became the first team to win the Constructors' Championship, held for the first time that season. However, Moss lost out to Mike Hawthorn in the Drivers' Championship by a single point to finish second, with Brooks ending the season in third. Their triumph at the end of the season was sadly marred when, during the final race of the year in Morocco, Lewis-Evans was fatally injured in an accident.

The 1958 season was the last one in which Vanwall entered every race. Vandervell's health was failing and he had been advised by his doctors to rest. The team continued half-heartedly.  Brooks made one appearance in a lower and lighter Vanwall at 1959 British Grand Prix, proving less successful against the new mid-engined Coopers, and the team tried again with another car in the 1960 French Grand Prix. These efforts lacked the seriousness of the past however and they were unsuccessful.

The last racing Vanwall was an "unwieldy" rear-engined machine produced for the 1961 3.0 litre Intercontinental Formula. Although showing promise when campaigned by John Surtees in two races, development was stopped short when the formula did not find success in Europe.

The Donington Collection had a complete example of each model, including the rear-engined car.

In 2003 Vanwall Cars was formed by Arthur Wolstenholme, producing the Vanwall GPR V12, a single-seater road-legal car bearing a strong resemblance to early Vanwall racing cars, and the Sports Racer, a two-seater of a similar style. In 2012 the trademark was acquired from Mahle Engine Systems UK by Sanderson International Marketing Ltd.
In Summer 2016 Vanwall completed and sold an official replica 1957 Vanwall and then in October 2020 Vanwall 1958 Ltd, majority owned by Iain Sanderson, announced the commissioning of Hall & Hall to build 6 original 1958 specification 'continuation cars'.

Formula One World Championship results
(key)

Non-championship Formula One results
(key)

Notes

References

Notes

Bibliography

External links

  Official website

Formula One constructors
Formula One entrants
British auto racing teams
British racecar constructors
1954 establishments in England
1961 disestablishments in England
Defunct motor vehicle manufacturers of England
Formula One World Constructors' Champions
Auto racing teams established in 1954
Auto racing teams disestablished in 1961